Israel Williams (1709–1788) was an American educator and judge who founded Williams College  in 1793 by bequest of Ephraim Williams. Williams and John Worthington were the executors of the will.

Israel Williams was half-brother of Elisha Williams.

References

External links
Ephraim Williams. Letter to Israel Williams, July 21, 1755
The Founding of Williams College.
Israel Williams Papers 1728-1785

1709 births
1788 deaths
People from Salem, Massachusetts
Williams, Israel
American educators
American judges
University and college founders
People of colonial Massachusetts